Timmiellaceae is a family of haplolepideous mosses (Dicranidae). It contains two genera, Luisierella and Timmiella, that were formerly place in family Pottiaceae.

Taxonomy

The genera Luisierella and Timmiella have been traditionally placed in family Pottiaceae in order Pottiales. However, phylogenetic analyses have found these genera to form a clade, as part of a protohaplolepidous grade of early branching lineages in Dicranidae, for which the family Timmiellaceae was erected. The family is not currently assigned to an order, although it may be sister to family Distichiaceae.

Genera and species

The family contains the following genera and species:

Luisierella 
Luisierella barbula 
Luisierella pusilla 
Luisierella stenocarpa 
Timmiella 
Timmiella acaulon 
Timmiella alata 
Timmiella anomala 
Timmiella barbuloides 
Timmiella brevidens 
Timmiella cameruniae 
Timmiella corniculata 
Timmiella crassinervis 
Timmiella diminuta 
Timmiella flexiseta 
Timmiella grosseserrata 
Timmiella multiflora 
Timmiella pelindaba 
Timmiella rosulata 
Timmiella subintegra 
Timmiella umbrosa

References

Moss families
Bryopsida